"Sognu" (English: "I Dream") is a song by Amaury Vassili that was the entry for France in the 2011 Eurovision Song Contest, held in Düsseldorf, Germany. Although it was a favourite to win the contest, it ended up in 15th position.

Background

Song selection 
The song was composed by Daniel Moyne and Quentin Bachelet (son of French singer Pierre Bachelet), who has been working with Vassili since the beginning of his career. The lyrics of "Sognu" were written by Jean-Pierre Marcellesi.

The song was chosen internally by France 3 and SACEM. "Sognu" was sung in the Corsican language, which marks the first French entry in the Eurovision Song Contest sung in Corsican since "Mama Corsica" in 1993.

Selection of Vassili 
Regarding the decision to select Amaury Vassili and "Sognu", Pierre Sled, program supervisor at France 3, declared: "We wanted someone young, representing the excellence of French music. We didn't hesitate much, given the fact that the other names were not satisfying". He pointed out that "the choice was driven by the desire to promote a young talented artist representing the best of French music and its diversity. That's why we quickly agreed an opera singer was the most elegant option. Amaury is an angel of music with a powerful voice. Without any hesitation, he was a perfect choice." The song was presented on 7 March. An English version of "Sognu", called "I Would Dream About Her", was written by UK songwriter Dele Ladimeji.

"Our goal is clear", Pierre Sled assured, "France 3 is the channel of French regions and we wanted to have them honored. Corsican is close to Italian, thus it will perfectly suit an opera song".

Promotion 
Vassili appeared on numerous shows, including Le Plus Grand Cabaret Du Monde, 13h00 news, Sidaction, Les Années Bonheur, Morandini. France3 aired a video about the contest, shortly before the Finale. It included visits to the press centre, the arena, and interviews with press and fans. On 29 April, a show called En Route Pour L'Eurovision Avec Amaury was broadcast on France3 on 9 May, five days before the Finale.

Amaury's record label, Warner Music Group, promoted Sognu throughout Europe by signing radio station deals. In addition, Warner Music Europe was preparing a European release of Vasilli's CD, which included "Sognu".

Music video 
The official music video premiered on 8 March 2011 on Vassili's official YouTube channel.

Track listing

Release history

Charts

References

External links 
 Official Amaury Vassili website

Eurovision songs of 2011
Eurovision songs of France
2011 singles
Corsican language
Corsican music
2011 songs
Warner Music Group singles